Anscombe is a surname. Notable people with the surname include:

 Edmund Anscombe (1874–1948), New Zealand architect
 Frank Anscombe (1918–2001), British statistician
 G. E. M. Anscombe (1919–2001), British analytic philosopher
 Gareth Anscombe (born 1991), Wales rugby union player
 John Anscombe (1838–1881), English cricketer
 Mark Anscombe, New Zealand rugby union coach
 Mike Anscombe, Canadian television news anchor